The 2010 U.S. Open Cup tournament proper features teams from the top five levels of the American Soccer Pyramid. These five levels, namely Major League Soccer, the United Soccer Leagues (First Division, Second Division, and Premier Development League), and the United States Adult Soccer Association, each have their own separate qualification process to trim their ranks down to their final team delegations in the months leading up to the start of the tournament proper.

The 2010 Cup will feature 8 teams from the MLS, 9 from the USSF Division 2 (being all 9 US-based teams), all 6 teams from the USL Second Division, 8 teams from the PDL, 8 from USASA, and an additional team resulting from a single match between Sonoma County Sol of the National Premier Soccer League and PSA Los Gatos Storm of US Club Soccer.  The eight clubs from MLS will receive byes into the Third Round.

Tier 1: Major League Soccer (MLS)
The top six MLS clubs in the 2009 standings were given six of the berths into the Third Round while the nine remaining U.S.-based clubs will compete for the final two berths via a playoff.

Bracket

Schedule
Note: Scorelines use the standard U.S. convention of placing the home team on the right-hand side of box scores.

Play-in Round

Qualification Semifinals

Qualification Finals

New York Red Bulls qualify for the Round of 16.

D.C. United qualify for the Round of 16.

Tier 2: USSF D-2 Pro League and Tier 3: USL-2
Due to the reshuffling of teams and the compromise between the United Soccer Leagues and the breakaway North American Soccer League, there are only 6 teams in USL-2 and 9 eligible teams in the newly formed USSF Division 2 Professional League (Montreal Impact, Vancouver Whitecaps FC and Puerto Rico Islanders are not eligible because they are Canadian or Puerto Rican clubs).  All 15 eligible teams will automatically qualify rather than 8 from each league as in years past, leaving an additional slot to be filled .

Tier 4: Premier Development League
PDL eligible clubs (59 of 67) qualify by playing in PDL league matches in April and May that double as US Open Cup qualifying matches.  The team with the best record in those games from each of the eight divisions will advance to the Cup.

The Abbotsford Mariners, Ottawa Fury, Toronto Lynx, Thunder Bay Chill, Vancouver Whitecaps Residency, Victoria Highlanders and Forest City London are not eligible because they are Canadian clubs. Also the Bermuda Hogges is not eligible because it is a Bermudian club.

Tier 5: United States Adult Soccer Association (USASA)
USASA is divided into four geographical regions, each of which will advance two teams to the US Open Cup.  Assuming the continuation of recent seasons' format, the two finalists in each region will be awarded berths.

Region I
Region I represents the northeastern region of the US.  The regional tournament began April 10 and the remaining four teams will compete in the semifinals on May 23.  The two regional finalists will advance to the 2010 US Open Cup.  The quarterfinalists are:

Region II
Region II represents the midwestern region of the US.  The regional tournament began May 1 and the semifinal matches were played May 15.  Both finalists qualified for the 2010 US Open Cup.  The quarterfinalists were:

Region III
Region III represents the southeastern region of the US.  The regional tournament was conducted from May 29 to May 30 at the University of Alabama.  Though it was originally scheduled to feature nine clubs organized into three groups of three followed by an elimination bracket, a lightning storm canceled the first day of games and Brazil Soccer Academy was disqualified for failing to show.  The tournament was reorganized into two groups of four with the winner of each group qualifying for the US Open Cup.

Region IV
Region IV represents the western region of the US.  The regional tournament was conducted from May 21 to May 23 in Sacramento, CA.  An initial eleven teams divided into three groups, each of which played round-robin, and the winner of each group as well as the best performing second place team advanced to a four team bracket.  The two semifinal winners advanced to the regional final as well as the 2010 US Open Cup.

40th place
Due to the 2010 restructuring of the USSF Division 2, only 15 US-based teams were available to take the USL and NASL's non-amateur slots.  On May 5, 2010 the USSF announced that the remaining slot would be allotted to the winner of a game between the Sonoma County Sol and PSA Los Gatos Storm, two California-based clubs in the US Soccer amateur structure.

References

External links
The Cup
USSF Announcement

Qual
2010 domestic association football cups